People's Servants for Latvia (TKL), initially Motherland, is a populist party in Latvia, founded in 2004. Its chairman was Viktors Kalnbērzs and its membership included currency exchange businessman Juris Žuravļovs. The founding parties were the Social Democratic Welfare Party led by Žuravļovs, "For Freedom, Social Justice and Equal Rights" (Russian abbreviation "ЗаСССР", meaning "For USSR") and the Latvian Youth Party of Jānis Kuzins. From 2005 Motherland was represented on the Riga City Council, being elected in a coalition with the Socialist Party of Latvia. In the 2006 parliamentary election Motherland got 2.08% and failed to gain representation in the Saeima. The coalition was dissolved in 2008.

The coalition was succeeded by the For the Motherland! party. Alīna Ļebedeva unsuccessfully stood as a candidate from the party in the 2009 European Parliament election. From 2012 to 2018 the party name was VSK For an Independent Latvia!.

For the 2018 Latvian parliamentary election, the party was refounded by Žuravļovs and Kuzins in April 2018 as SDK Dzimtene as a member of the For Alternative alliance and advocated for the introduction of a syndicalist economy in Latvia. 

Before the 2019 European Parliament election the alliance renamed in March 2019, this time to New Harmony, taking inspiration from election competitors SDP Harmony and New Unity. SDK Dzimtene was renamed Par Jaunu Saskaņu (For a New Harmony) in March 2020.

In June 2022 the party leadership was taken over by the activists of the association People's Servants, a group founded during the COVID-19 pandemic to oppose restrictions. The leader of the group, Aivars Smans, became the new chairman of the party that was subsequently renamed People's Servants for Latvia.

Election results

Legislative elections

References

Defunct political party alliances in Latvia
Russian political parties in Latvia
Socialist parties in Latvia
Syndicalism
Left-wing political party alliances